Scott Leva  (born May 29, 1958) is a stuntman and stunt coordinator who began his career as a gymnast and entered stuntwork in the 1970s.

Biography

Spider-Man

In 1985, Scott was tapped by Cannon Films & Joseph Zito (who was the 2nd director to replace Tobe Hooper as being the first director attached for Spider-Man) to play Spider-Man in their adaptation of the comics,  He was also the actor on the first photographic cover of a Spider-Man comic book, appearing as Peter Parker, half-way in costume, on The Amazing Spider-Man, #262 (cover date March 1985). He can be seen in costume as Spider-Man, on the blooper reel for the 2000 film X-Men, on which he served as a stunt-coordinator.

Safety equipment designer
After a friend died doing a high fall, Scott started to tinker with the standard airbags used by stunt performers and eventually designed an airbag with a different structure. The older airbags had a tendency to throw a stunt performer if they didn't hit the bag perfectly, the new bag uses a different arrangements of air bladders and a less slippery top layer to help the performer to stay on the bag. He was awarded a Science and Technical Oscar for this design.

Awards
 2003 World Stunt Awards Nominated for Best High Work for a 125-foot fall onto the top of a car on Ballistic: Ecks VS. Sever
 2003 World Stunt Awards Nominated for Best Overall Stunt Performer as stunt coordinator on Ballistic: Ecks VS. Sever
 2006 Academy Awards Science and Technical Oscar for his design of a safer air bag for high fall stunt work

Filmography highlights

Stunts or Stunt Coordinator
	Changeling (2008) (utility stunts)
	Terminator: The Sarah Connor Chronicles (stunt rigger) (utility stunts)
	Dexter (stunt rigger) (1 episode, 2007)
	2007 Taurus World Stunt Awards (2007) (TV) (utility stunts)
	Hannah Montana (stunt rigger)
	Letters from Iwo Jima (2006) (utility stunts)
	Flags of Our Fathers (2006) (assistant stunt coordinator)
	Crank (2006) (stunt safety)
	Zoom (2006) (stunts)
	World Trade Center (2006) (stunts)
	Everybody Hates Chris (2005) TV series (stunt rigger)
	Lemony Snicket's A Series of Unfortunate Events (2004) (stunts)
	Desperate Housewives (2004) TV series (stunt rigger)
	Collateral (2004) (stunts)
	World's Finest (2004) (aerial stunt effects coordinator) (stunt coordinator)
	2003 ABC World Stunt Awards (2003) (TV) (utility stunts)
	Taken (2003) (stunts)
	Ballistic: Ecks vs Sever (2002) (assistant stunt coordinator) (stunts: high fall)
	Enterprise (2001) TV series (stunt double)
	The Best Damn Sports Show Period (2001) TV series (utility stunts)
	X-Men (2000) (stunt coordinator: second unit) (stunts)
	Timecop (1997) TV series (stunts)
	Buffy the Vampire Slayer (1997) TV series (stunts)
	Space Truckers (1996) (stunt double) (stunts)
	Nash Bridges (1996) TV series (stunt performer)
	 Baywatch Nights (1995) TV series (stunts)
	 Sliders (1995) TV series (stunts)
	 OP Center (1995) (TV) (stunts)
	 Star Trek: Voyager (1995) TV series (stunts)
	 Lois & Clark: The New Adventures of Superman (1993) TV series (stunts)
	 Mighty Morphin' Power Rangers (1993) TV series (stunt double)
	 Robin Hood: Men in Tights (1993) (stunts)
	 Star Trek: Deep Space Nine (1993) TV series (stunts)
	 Hook (1991) (stunts)
	 Star Trek VI: The Undiscovered Country (1991) (stunts)
	 The Rocketeer (1991) (stunts)
	 The Toxic Avenger Part III: The Last Temptation of Toxie (1989) (stunt coordinator) (stunts)
	 Police Academy 6: City Under Siege (1989) (stunts)
	The Toxic Avenger Part II (1989) (stunt coordinator)
	 Troma's War (1988) (stunt coordinator)
	 Prime Evil (1988) (stunt double) (stunts)
	 The Big Giver (1988) (stunt coordinator)
	 Star Trek: The Next Generation (1987) TV series (stunts)
	 Beauty and the Beast (1987) TV series (stunts)
	 Prizzi's Honor (1985) (stunts)
	 The Toxic Avenger (1985) (stunt coordinator)
	 Desperately Seeking Susan (1985) (stunt coordinator)
	 Turk 182! (1985) (stunts)
	 The Cotton Club (1984) (stunts)
	 Splash (1984) (stunts)
	 The World According to Garp (1982) (stunts)
	 Fort Apache the Bronx (1981) (stunts)
	 Superman (1978) (stunts)

Actor

Film
The Toxic Avenger (1984, as policeman, uncredited)
Invaders from Mars (1986, as Marine officer)
The Toxic Avenger Part II (1989, as the Dark Rider, uncredited)
Sweet Justice (1993, as River Goon)
Private Wars (1993, as Mrs. Dominick's Son)
Stranger by Night (1994, as Bobby's Father, (flashbacks), uncredited)
To the Limit (1995, as Carlo)
Back to Back (1996, as Officer Williams)
Monkey Business (1998, as Bankrobber 1
The Base (1999, as Front Gate MP #1)
X-Men, (2000, as Waterboy #2)
Ballistic: Ecks vs. Sever, (2002, as Lone Sniper)
Red Eye, (2005, as Keefe's Bodyguard)
Changeling (2008, as Mountie)

Television
Dynasty (1983, 1 episode, as waiter)
Star Trek: The Next Generation (1989, Episode: Unnatural Selection, as Command Division Officer)
Santa Barbara (1991, 1 episode, as Thug No. 1)
Star Trek: Deep Space Nine (1996, Episode: To the Death, as Ramirez, uncredited)
Star Trek: Voyager (1996, Episode: Remember, as Fredick, uncredited)
Diagnosis: Murder (1996, Episode: A Model Murder, as Ray Donovan)
Lois & Clark: The New Adventures of Superman (1997, Episode: Sex, Lies and Videotape, as Thug)
Star Trek: Deep Space Nine (1997, Episode: Soldiers of the Empire, as Ortakin)
Nash Bridges (1999, Episode: Power Play, as Mobster 2)
Star Trek: Deep Space Nine (1999, Episode: What You Leave Behind, as Jem'Hadar Guard, uncredited)
Relic Hunter (1999, Episode: Transformation, as Tough Hombre #1)
The Sarah Silverman Program (2010, Episode: A Slip Slope, as Fireman #4)

Second Unit Director or Assistant Director
	Ritual (2001/I) (second unit director)
	Pilgrim (2000) (second unit director)
	If Dog Rabbit (1999) (second unit director)
	The Heist (1999) (second unit director)
	Southern Cross (1999) (second unit director)
	The Outsider (1998) (TV) (second unit director)
	Mars (1998) (second unit director)
	Acts of Betrayal (1997) (second unit director)
	Mercenary (1997) (TV) (second unit director)
	The Journey: Absolution (1997) (second unit director)
	Mercenary II: Thick & Thin (1997) (TV) (second unit director)

Director
	The Greatest Show Ever (2007) (TV)

References
NPR story about the Tech Oscars
Wired Magazine
Cinefantastique Magazine, September 1987, Volume 17, Issue 5 pgs 4, 5, 59
Stuntplayer Resume

External links
His company Precision Stunts

Complete resume in PDF Format

1958 births
American gymnasts
American stunt performers
Living people